Iain Francis Angus (born June 1, 1947) is a Canadian politician, who has served in the Legislative Assembly of Ontario and the House of Commons of Canada, as well as on Thunder Bay City Council.

Then an employee with the city of Thunder Bay, Angus entered electoral politics in the 1975 provincial election as the Ontario New Democratic Party candidate in Fort William. He served until the 1977 election, when he was defeated by Mickey Hennessy.

He returned to work for the city, unsuccessfully standing as a federal New Democratic Party candidate in the 1979 and 1980 elections for the electoral district of Thunder Bay—Atikokan. On his third campaign as a federal candidate, he was elected in the 1984 election, winning over Progressive Conservative candidate Ken Boshcoff by a margin of 2,675 votes. He served until the 1993 election, when he was defeated by Liberal candidate Stan Dromisky.

Angus subsequently launched his own business as a consultant. He was elected to the Thunder Bay City Council in the 2003 municipal election and was re-elected in 2006, 2010, and 2014. He ran unsuccessfully for mayor in the 2018 municipal election.

Electoral record

|}

|}

|}

|}

|}

References

External links
 Iain Angus profile at Thunder Bay City Council webpage
 
 

1947 births
Members of the House of Commons of Canada from Ontario
New Democratic Party MPs
Ontario New Democratic Party MPPs
Thunder Bay city councillors
Living people
Canadian Presbyterians
Presidents of the New Democratic Party of Canada